The Norwich Merchants are a junior hockey team based in Norwich, Ontario, Canada.  They are members of the Provincial Junior Hockey League of the Ontario Hockey Association.

History
Founded in 1968, the Merchants won the Southern Counties Junior D Hockey League championship the next season, then went on to win the OHA Cup as provincial champions by defeating the Haliburton Huskies of the Central League.

In 1980, the Merchants were promoted to Junior C and joined the Niagara & District Junior C Hockey League.  In 1986, the Merchants were Niagara League champions.  They went on to defeat the Bradford Blues of the Mid-Ontario Junior Hockey League to win the Clarence Schmalz Cup as OHA Junior C champions.  In 1987, they were again Niagara League champions.  They again made it to the provincial final, but this time lost to the Lakefield Chiefs of the Central Ontario Junior C Hockey League.

In November 2011, the Merchants were sanctioned by the Ontario Hockey Association for the overpayment of a former player during his time with the team.  Although the team claimed the money was for education purposes, the OHA fined the team $25,000, suspended three board members for the rest of the season and three additional seasons, their 2011-12 roster was frozen for the rest of the season, and they were barred from signing imports for three following seasons.  The Merchants appealed the decision to the Ontario Hockey Federation.  The OHF overturned the roster freeze and import restrictions saying that it was not within the OHA's constitution to wield those powers.  Both sides then appealed to Hockey Canada who sided with neither party, which left the fine and suspensions in place.

After thirty-three years as members of the Niagara & District Junior C Hockey League, the Ontario Hockey Association realigned and the Merchants ended up in the new Midwestern Junior C Hockey League. Three years later the eight Southern Ontario junior "C" hockey leagues amalgamated into one league, the Provincial Junior Hockey League.  This means that they are now competing in the  Pat Doherty Division of the Central Conference.

The playoffs for the 2019-20 season were cancelled due to the COVID-19 pandemic, leading to the team not being able to play a single game.

Season-by-season record
Note: GP = Games Played, W = Wins, L = Losses, T = Ties, OTL = Overtime Losses, GF = Goals for, GA = Goals against

Clarence Schmalz Cup Final appearances
1986: Norwich Merchants defeated Bradford Blues 4-games-to-3
1987: Lakefield Chiefs defeated Norwich Merchants 4-games-to-2

References

External links
Norwich Merchants

Niagara Junior C Hockey League teams
Ice hockey clubs established in 1968
1968 establishments in Ontario
Oxford County, Ontario